On October 10, 2017, Trinidad and Tobago played against the United States at the Ato Boldon Stadium in Couva in what was the final 2018 FIFA World Cup qualification match for both teams. Trinidad and Tobago won the match 2–1 which resulted in the United States missing their first World Cup since 1986, as well as Trinidad and Tobago's first win over the United States since 2008, and their third win against them in international football.

Background

Following consecutive losses to Mexico and Costa Rica in the opening games of the final round of qualification in the 2018 FIFA World Cup, Jürgen Klinsmann was fired from the United States men's national team job and replaced by former USMNT manager Bruce Arena. On his 3rd game back in charge, Arena coached the US to a 6–0 victory over Honduras, and 4 days later got a 1–1 draw against Panama at Panama City. Three months after that, they beat Trinidad and Tobago 2–0 in Commerce City, Colorado, both goals coming from Christian Pulisic, giving the United States a total of 7 points in the qualification group standings. After earning only 2 points from their next three games, the United States hosted Panama and got a 4–0 victory before traveling to Trinidad and Tobago for the game.

Despite their unremarkable play to that point, the United States entered their final WCQ match in excellent position to secure an eighth-consecutive World Cup appearance, and a seemingly impossible combination of results would have to occur to prevent this. With a win, the U.S. would mathematically guarantee qualification for the World Cup regardless of the outcome of the other two matches. A draw, likewise, would be enough to clinch a World Cup spot, barring an extraordinarily unlikely combination of scores from the other two matches: an 8-goal margin of victory for low-scoring Panama (against Costa Rica) and a 13-goal margin of victory for second-from-last Honduras (against undefeated Mexico).

Even with a loss to the underdog Trinadians, the Americans would still qualify with either a loss or a draw by both Panama and Honduras. Moreover, if one of these two teams were to win, the U.S. would remain in contention with a loss or a draw by the other; this latter scenario would lock the U.S. into fourth-place and force a two-legged tie with Australia. In summary, there were 26 of 27 possible W-L-D combinations which would allow the USMNT to punch its ticket to Russia the following summer.

Trinidad and Tobago, meanwhile, was already eliminated, and had almost nothing to play for besides revenge for Paul Caligiuri's infamous goal in 1989, which allowed the US to qualify in Trinidad's place.

Before the match, the CONCACAF Fifth Round table was as follows:

Pre-match 
The match was played at the smaller Ato Boldon Stadium instead of Hasely Crawford Stadium due to the stadium's issues with its floodlights.  Heavy rain in the days preceding the match meant that the field at Ato Boldon Stadium was soaked, impeding practice the day before the match on October 9.

As Trinidad and Tobago were already eliminated from advancement to the World Cup, they included a number of young and untested players in their starting lineup rather than their usual starters, a common practice.

Match

Summary 

A botched back pass in the 17th minute resulted in a catastrophic own goal by the US team from Omar Gonzalez. While Trinidad and Tobago had few high quality shot attempts in the first half, a "blistering 35-yard strike" from Alvin Jones managed to get in regardless to give them a 2–0 lead going into the second half. The US team managed to score a goal in the second half by Christian Pulisic and substituted in some fresh strikers to up their goal-scoring chances, but were unable to tie the score by the end of the game.

Details 

|valign="top" width="50%"|

|}

Post-match

Results 

To the surprise of many, both Central American underdogs, Panama and Honduras, won against Costa Rica and Mexico respectively. Panamanian forward Blas Pérez scored a controversial "ghost goal" in the 53rd minute to equalize the score 1–1, before Román Torres scored the winning goal in the 88th minute. Honduras also pulled a comeback in their win against Mexico. The Mexican team had a 2–1 lead at half-time before Eddie Hernández's shot bounced off of the crossbar and hit the back of Mexican goalkeeper Guillermo Ochoa's head and went into the net, putting the score at 2–2. Seven minutes later, Romell Quioto scored the winning goal for Honduras, ending Mexico's chance to go unbeaten throughout the qualifying rounds. Because of the United States' loss and their win, Panama qualified automatically for the group stage of the 2018 competition, while Honduras advanced to the CONCACAF–AFC play-off matches against Australia.

Reactions

Media

The result and failure for the U.S. to qualify made national and international news overnight. ESPN FC hosted a segment on the game and openly criticized the "arrogance" that the United States team had. Alejandro Moreno criticized the players' commitment and passion for the game. Shaka Hislop, a former goalkeeper who represented Trinidad and Tobago in the 2006 FIFA World Cup, blamed the U.S. media for asking Arena about the performance of European players and other unrelated questions of the match the day before. Hislop also criticized the United States team for their criticism of the field conditions.

Taylor Twellman went on an unscripted rant on ESPN in which he highlighted the lack of focus on the match at hand, claiming other players and broadcasters asked for the other scoreline from the other matches in qualifying. Twellman stated the United States needs to revise everything about the United States Soccer Federation, including Major League Soccer, the "pay to play" system of U.S. youth soccer, and other aspects of the federation. He cited efforts by the German Football Association as an example of a nation that had successfully changed its culture after the national team's failure in Euro 2000 and Euro 2004. Twellman further added similar dissatisfaction with the pitch criticism, citing Bosnia and Herzegovina and Belgium playing against each other on what he termed a "cow pasture". Twellman also complained that Iceland qualified for the World Cup while the United States did not. The next day, he said the US men's national team had an arrogance that he cannot understand and that soccer must not be the American way.

An analysis by the sports side of the blog FiveThirtyEight called the match "the worst loss in USMNT's history based on the Elo rating system" since the USMNT was so heavily favored, which made the loss all the more stinging due to the high stakes involved.  A retrospective by the sports blog SB Nation agreed, calling the match the worst in the US men's team's history.

Some news outlets and journalists described this American loss as a "revenge", particularly by pointing that the United States had prevented Trinidad and Tobago, Costa Rica, and Panama from qualifying to the 1990, 2010, and 2014 World Cups, respectively. Writing for Wired868, Trinidadian journalist Lasana Liburd published a note titled "Mr. Jones Stuns USA! American World Cup Dreams Drown in River of Tears at Couva", where he mocked the US by saying "Make America Great Again? We'd rather not" and that Kelvin Jones, who was an unused substitute during the United States' victory over Trinidad and Tobago in 1989, had his son Alvin ensuring "that, for at least the next four years, the USA's Pulisic will now know how he felt." The Daily Express' Susan Mohammed reported that Trinidadian politician and former CONCACAF president Jack Warner rejoiced on the US elimination with phrases such as "this is the happiest day of my life", "nobody in CONCACAF likes the US", and that "other teams within the CONCACAF sought to 'help one another' but the US team sought to 'embarrass them'." Praising Costa Rica's qualification to the World Cup, La Nación's Amado Hidalgo felt "lurked" by the memories of Jonathan Bornstein and Graham Zusi scoring last-minute goals that left Costa Rica and Panama out of the 2010 and 2014 World Cups, respectively, and expressed that "maybe Trinidad avenged us all and buried the American dream of Bruce Arena and his legion." On Twitter, the Mexican version of ESPN suggested that Panama's qualification over the United States was "a revenge", given that a goal by an American player left Panama out of the 2014 World Cup much like a goal by a Panamanian player left the United States out of the 2018 World Cup. Spanish statistician and journalist Alexis Tamayo mocked the United States by telling Graham Zusi "you are going to watch [the 2018 World Cup] on television."

United States national team
Bruce Arena resigned as the manager of the team shortly after the match. Omar Gonzalez in a post-match press conference stated his own goal "is one that will haunt me forever."

See also
 Uruguay v Brazil (1950 FIFA World Cup)
 1985 China v Hong Kong football match
 1993 Japan v Iraq football match
 1998 FIFA World Cup qualification (AFC–OFC play-off)
 Brazil v Germany (2014 FIFA World Cup)
 2018 FIFA World Cup Group F#South Korea vs Germany
 History of the United States men's national soccer team
 Shot heard round the world (soccer)
 United States v England (1950 FIFA World Cup)

References 

2018 FIFA World Cup qualification (CONCACAF)
FIFA World Cup qualification matches
Trinidad and Tobago national football team matches
United States men's national soccer team matches
2017 in American soccer
2017–18 in Trinidad and Tobago football
October 2017 sports events in North America